Roberto Luiz Bianchi Pelliser (born 6 November 1966) is a Brazilian football coach and former player who is the manager of Ugandan club Vipers SC.

Playing career
As a player, he played as a defender for Spanish clubs Caravaca and Yeclano.

Coaching career
He managed Spanish club teams Ciudad de Murcia, Atlético Ciudad, Zamora and Lorca Deportiva. He also coached in Indonesia and Jordan.

He became manager of the Angola national team in March 2017; at the time he had been manager of Angolan club side Petro de Luanda since 2016. He was replaced by Srđan Vasiljević in December 2017. He left Petro in April 2019. In 2020 he began managing Kuwaiti club Kazma. He left Kazma in June 2021.

After managing Angolan club Interclube in 2021, in January 2023 he became manager of Ugandan club Vipers SC.

Personal life
He is of Spanish descent.

References

1966 births
Living people
Brazilian people of Spanish descent
Brazilian footballers
Caravaca CF players
Yeclano Deportivo players
Segunda División B players
Brazilian expatriate footballers
Expatriate footballers in Spain
Association football defenders
Brazilian football managers
Ciudad de Murcia managers
Zamora CF managers
Lorca Deportiva CF managers
Angola national football team managers
Kazma SC managers
Vipers SC players
Kuwait Premier League players
Brazilian expatriate football managers
Brazilian expatriate sportspeople in Spain
Expatriate football managers in Spain
Brazilian expatriate sportspeople in Angola
Expatriate football managers in Angola
Brazilian expatriate sportspeople in Kuwait
Expatriate football managers in Kuwait
Brazilian expatriate sportspeople in Indonesia
Expatriate football managers in Indonesia
Brazilian expatriate sportspeople in Jordan
Expatriate football managers in Jordan
Brazilian expatriate sportspeople in Uganda
Expatriate football managers in Uganda
Vipers SC managers